Yeylaq-e Shomali Rural District (is a rural district (dehestan, Nawçe in Kurdish) in the Central District of Dehgolan County, Kurdistan Province, Iran. At the 2006 census, its population was 6,169, in 1,398 families. The rural district has 30 villages.

References 

Rural Districts of Kurdistan Province
Dehgolan County